Ezekiel Gray, known as The Man Ezeke, was a Jamaican radio presenter and musician. He was born in Montego Bay, Jamaica.

Gray began his career at ERI, a pirate radio station, in the 1980s. He subsequently presented the Jammin' Oldies Saturday night show on Cork's 96FM. In October 1990, he began presenting a reggae show called The Sunshine Show on BBC Radio 1 on Wednesday nights. On 3 January 1993, Gray took over the Sunday lunchtime slot previously presented by Alan Freeman. He was the first black presenter with a regular daytime slot on the station.

Gray died in Jamaica in March 2022. He had a wife and two children.

References 

20th-century births
2022 deaths
Jamaican radio presenters
BBC Radio 1 presenters
People from Montego Bay